Zimbabwean Australians are Australian citizens who are fully or partially of Zimbabwean descent or Zimbabwe-born people who reside in Australia. They include migrants to Australia of people from Zimbabwe (Rhodesia or Southern Rhodesia until 1980), as well as their descendants. Today,  there are over 65,000 Zimbabwean Australians, with significant growth since 2000, coinciding with the sociopolitical crisis there.

Australia's Zimbabwean community is now well established, with some of the highest incomes in the country, as well as with community institutions such as Zimbabwean language schools.

Background

Much like South Africans, Zimbabweans began immigrating to Australia in the late 1970s, in modest numbers of mostly white Zimbabweans until the late nineties. Since 2000, the volume of migration has increased and diversified significantly, with a mix of professionals, investors, students and recent graduates choosing to move to Australia. Compared to their contemporaries in South Africa, the Zimbabwean community in Australia is highly educated and firmly within the middle class. The vast majority are skilled and educated, with 74.5% of the Zimbabwe-born aged 15 years and over possessing higher non-school 
qualifications, compared to 55.9% of the Australian population. Some Zimbabweans had originally moved to South Africa or the UK, but decided to settle in Australia instead.

Economic Profile
Zimbabweans form a significant community in Australia with their numbers having grown to over 34,787 Zimbabwe-born as of 2018. When including their Australian and foreign born members, the government estimates at least 80,000 people being equally divided between black and white Zimbabweans The community is now well established, with some of the highest incomes in the country, as well as with community institutions such as Zimbabwean language schools. One in three of Australia's Shona and Ndebele-speakers live in Sydney with other concentrations of Zimbabweans in Perth, Melbourne and Queensland. Indeed, some 78 per cent of Zimbabwean Aussie adults hold a tertiary degree, making them the best educated group in the country

Along with their fellow South African immigrants, the Zimbabwean Australian community has become something of an invisible model minority in Australia, in part because they are represented as having a high degree of integration within the Australian society as well as economic and academic success. Furthermore, Zimbabweans in Australia on average have a high level of education attainment, as well as higher than average incomes, which can be partially attributed to Zimbabwe's high education rates as well as the growing popularity of Australian universities as an affordable alternative for foreign students.

Unlike their counterparts from Asia, they have not formed distinct enclaves within the major cities of Australia and the degree of assimilation is higher than most recent migrants to Australia, due to better cultural, historical, and linguistic similarities with Australia. Despite this, the community is still strongly attached to its homeland while being increasing integrated into Australian society, with many travelling back and forth.

Population distribution
Australia's Zimbabwean population is biggest in Sydney. Historically, Perth was a popular first stop for recent migrants, thanks to its relative proximity to Southern Africa and its already established South African Australian population, but increasingly modern immigrants are drawn to Sydney and Melbourne although a large proportion of Zimbabweans in Australia still reside in Western Australia. Many white Zimbabweans have settled in Queensland, whereas people of indigenous Shona and Ndebele ethnicities commonly settle in Sydney or Melbourne.

Language

New South Wales
Australians who speak a language indigenous to Zimbabwe at home are most numerous in Sydney. One in three of Australia's Ndebele-speakers and one in three of Australia's Shona-speakers live in Sydney.

Victoria
English, Shona and Afrikaans are the main languages Zimbabwean Australians in Victoria speak at home. 53% of Zimbabwean Australians in Victoria speak English, while 36% speak Shona and 1% speak Afrikaans.

Notable Zimbabwean Australians

 Rob Adams - architect
 Greg Aplin - former television manager and politician in New South Wales
 Scott Brant
 Hilton Cartwright - cricket player for Western Australia and the Australian national cricket team
 Rick Cosnett - actor
 Chris Ellison - lawyer and former Senator for Western Australia
 Jerome Farah - musician 
 George Gregan - Rugby World Cup winner and former captain of Australia
 Kyle Godwin - rugby player for the Western Force
 Murray Goodwin - cricketer for Zimbabwe and Western Australia
 Elizabeth Haran - novelist 
 Panashe Madanha - professional football player for Adelaide United
 Tkay Maidza - singer-songwriter
 Solomon Mire - Big Bash and retired Zimbabwean cricketer
 Audius Mtawarira - singer and record producer
 Andrew Murray - former Senator for the Australian Democrats
 Janine Murray - rhythmic gymnast
 Pacharo Mzembe - actor
 Tendai Mzungu - Australian rules footballer for Fremantle Football Club and Greater Western Sydney Giants
 Sekai Nzenza-Shand
 Henry Olonga - opera singer and ex Zimbabwean cricketer. Voice contestant.
 Kevin Parker - multi-instrumentalist, producer and lead singer of Tame Impala
 Ian Perrie - former Australian rules footballer who played for the Adelaide Crows
 David Pocock - player for the Australian national rugby union team
 Ian Prior - rugby player for the Western Force
 Clive Puzey - racing driver
 Carmouflage Rose - stage name of rapper Larry Herrington.
 Thando Sikwila - singer, songwriter and actor 
 Tando Velaphi - professional football player for Perth Glory 
 Alfonso Zvenyika Lambarda
 Sara Zwangobani - actress The Lord of the Rings: The Rings of Power

See also

 Zimbabwean diaspora
 South African Australian
 Zimbabwean Canadians
 Zimbabwean Americans
 Zimbabweans in Ireland
 Zimbabweans in the United Kingdom
 Zimbabweans in France
 Zimbabwean New Zealanders

References

Ethnic groups in Australia

African Australian